A Counterblaste to Tobacco is a treatise written by King James VI of Scotland and I of England in 1604, in which he expresses his distaste for tobacco, particularly tobacco smoking. As such, it is one of the earliest anti-tobacco publications.

Style and content
It is written in Early Modern English and refers to medical theories of the time (e.g. the four humours). In it, James blames Native Americans for bringing tobacco to Europe, complains about passive smoking, warns of dangers to the lungs, and decries tobacco's odour as "hatefull to the nose."

Effects and legacy
James's dislike of tobacco led him in 1604 to authorize Thomas Sackville, 1st Earl of Dorset, to levy an excise tax and tariff of six shillings and eight pence per pound of tobacco imported, or £1 per three pounds, a large sum of money for the time.

Because of continued high demand for tobacco in England and negative effects on the economies of the American colonies, the king in 1624 instead created a royal monopoly for the crop. 150 years later, British utilitarian philosopher Jeremy Bentham would cite A Counterblaste to Tobacco as an example of antipathy run wild.

Quotation

References

External links 

 Full text of A Counterblaste to Tobacco
 A Counterblaste to Tobacco on Google Books

Works by James VI and I
History of tobacco
Medical literature
1604 books
Smoking in the United Kingdom